Geranylacetone is an organic compound with the formula CH3C(O)(CH2)2CH=C(CH3)(CH2)2CH=C(CH3)2.  A colorless oil, it is the product of coupling geranyl and acetonyl groups. It is a precursor to synthetic squalene.

Synthesis and occurrence
Geranylacetone can be produced by transesterification of ethyl acetoacetate with linalool:

The esterification of linalool can also be effected with ketene or isopropenyl methyl ether. The resulting linalyl ester undergoes Carroll rearrangement to give geranylacetone.  Geranyl acetone is a precursor to isophytol, which is used in the manufacture of Vitamin E.  Other derivatives of geranyl acetone are farnesol and nerolidol.

Geranylacetone is a flavor component of many plants including rice, mango, and tomatoes.  

Together with other ketones, geranylacetone results from the degradation of vegetable matter by ozone.

Biosynthesis
It arises by the oxidation of certain carotenoids. Such reaction are catalyzed by carotenoid oxygenase.

References

Monoterpenes
Flavors